Hans Kaulich was an Austrian footballer, referee and manager.

Career
Before the outbreak of World War I, Kaulich played for Vienna Cricket and Football-Club as a forward.

Following the war, Kaulich became a referee.

On 29 November 1954, Kaulich was appointed manager of the Austria national team. On 27 March 1955, Kaulich managed Austria for the only time, culminating in a 3–2 defeat against Czechoslovakia in the 1955–60 Central European International Cup. Kaulich resigned from the post the following day, citing the rebuilding effort following the 1954 FIFA World Cup to be too great.

References

Date of birth missing
Year of birth missing
Date of death missing
Year of death missing
Association football forwards
Austrian footballers
Austrian football referees
Austrian football managers
Austria national football team managers